Nath, also called Natha, are a Shaiva sub-tradition within Hinduism in India and Nepal. A medieval movement, it combined ideas from Buddhism, Shaivism and Yoga traditions in India. The Naths have been a confederation of devotees who consider Shiva, as their first lord or guru, with varying lists of additional gurus. Of these, the 9th or 10th century Matsyendranath and the ideas and organization mainly developed by Gorakhnath are particularly important. Gorakhnath is considered the originator of the Nath Panth.

Nath tradition has extensive Shaivism-related theological literature of its own, most of which is traceable to 11th century CE or later. However, its roots are in far more ancient Siddha tradition. A notable aspect of Nath tradition practice have been its refinements and use of Yoga, particularly Hatha Yoga, to transform one's body into a sahaja siddha state of awakened self’s identity with absolute reality. An accomplished guru, that is, a yoga and spiritual guide, is considered essential, and they have historically been known for their esoteric and heterodox practices.

Their unconventional ways challenged all orthodox premises, exploring dark and shunned practices of society as a means to understanding theology and gaining inner powers. They formed monastic organizations, itinerant groups that walked great distances to sacred sites and festivals such as the Kumbh Mela as a part of their spiritual practice. The Nath also have a large settled householder tradition in parallel to its monastic groups. Some of them metamorphosed into warrior ascetics during the Islamic rule of the Indian subcontinent.

The Nath tradition was influenced by other Indian traditions such as Advaita Vedanta monism, and in turn influenced it as well as movements within Vaishnavism, Shaktism and Bhakti movement through saints such as Kabir and Namdev.

Etymology and nomenclature

The Sanskrit word nātha  नाथ literally means "lord, protector, master". The related Sanskrit term Adi Natha means first or original Lord, and is a synonym for Shiva, the founder of the Nāthas. Initiation into the Nātha sampradaya includes receiving a name ending in -nath, -yogi, or -jogi.

According to the yoga scholar James Mallinson, the term Nath is a neologism for various groups previously known as yogi or jogi before the 18th century. Within the Natha tradition, however, it is said that the identifier Nath began with the figures of Matsyendranath in the 10th century and his guru Shiva, known as Adinath (first lord). During East India Company and later British Raj rule, itinerant yogis were suppressed and many were forced into householder life. Many of their practices were banned in an attempt to limit their political and military power in North India. During colonial rule the term Yogi/Jogi became a derisive word and they were classified by British India census as a "low status caste". In the 20th century, the community began to use the alternate term Nath instead in their public relations, while continuing to use their historical term of yogi or jogi to refer to each other within the community. The term Nath or Natha, with the meaning of lord, is a generic Sanskrit theological term found in all the dharmic religions that utilize Sanskrit. It is found in Vaishnavism (e.g. Gopinath, Jagannath), Buddhism (e.g. Minanath), and in Jainism (Adinatha, Parsvanatha).

The term yogi or jogi is not limited to Natha subtradition, and has been widely used in Indian culture for anyone who is routinely devoted to yoga. Some memoirs by travelers such as those by the Italian traveler Varthema refer to the Nath Yogi people they met, phonetically as Ioghes.

History

Nath are a sub-tradition within Shaivism, who trace their lineage to nine Nath gurus, starting with Shiva as the first, or ‘’Adinatha’’. The list of the remaining eight is somewhat inconsistent between the regions Nath sampradaya is found, but typically consists of c. 9th century Matsyendranatha and c. 12th century Gorakhshanatha along with six more. The other six vary between Buddhist texts such as Abhyadattasri, and Hindu texts such as Varnaratnakara and Hathapradipika. The most common remaining Nath gurus include Caurangi (Sarangadhara, Puran Bhagat), Jalandhara (Balnath, Hadipa), Carpatha, Kanhapa, Nagarjuna and Bhartrihari.

The Nath tradition was not a new movement, but one evolutionary phase of a very old Siddha tradition of India. The Siddha tradition explored Yoga, with the premise that human existence is a psycho-chemical process that can be perfected by a right combination of psychological, alchemy and physical techniques, thereby empowering one to a state of highest spirituality, living in prime condition ad libitum, and dying when one so desires into a calm, blissful transcendental state. The term siddha means "perfected", and this premise was not limited to Siddha tradition but was shared by others such as the Rasayana school of Ayurveda.

Deccan roots
According to Mallinson, "the majority of the early textual and epigraphic references to Matsyendra and Goraksa are from the Deccan region and elsewhere in peninsular India; the others are from eastern India". The oldest iconography of Nath-like yogis is found in the Konkan region (near the coast of Maharashtra, Goa, Karnataka). The Vijayanagara Empire artworks include them, as do texts from a region now known as Maharashtra, northern Karnataka and Kerala. The Chinese traveller, named Ma Huan, visited a part of the western coast of India, wrote a memoir, and he mentions the Nath Yogis. The oldest texts of the Nath tradition that describe pilgrimage sites include predominantly sites in the Deccan region and the eastern states of India, with hardly any mention of north, northwest or south India. This community also can be found in some parts of Rajasthan but these are normal like other castes, considered as other backward castes.

Gorakhshanatha is traditionally credited with founding the tradition of renunciate ascetics, but the earliest textual references about the Nath ascetic order as an organized entity (sampradaya), that have survived into the modern era, are from the 17th century. Before the 17th century, while a mention of the Nath sampradaya as a monastic institution is missing, extensive isolated mentions about the Nath Shaiva people are found in inscriptions, texts and temple iconography from earlier centuries.

In the Deccan region, only since the 18th century according to Mallison, Dattatreya has been traditionally included as a Nath guru as a part of Vishnu-Shiva syncretism. According to others, Dattatreya has been the revered as the Adi-Guru (First Teacher) of the Adinath Sampradaya of the Nathas, the first "Lord of Yoga" with mastery of Tantra (techniques).

The number of Nath gurus also varies between texts, ranging from 4, 9, 18, 25 and so on. The earliest known text that mentions nine Nath gurus is the 15th century Telugu text Navanatha Charitra. Individually, the names of Nath Gurus appear in much older texts. For example, Matsyendranatha is mentioned as a siddha in section 29.32 of the 10th century text Tantraloka of the Advaita and Shaivism scholar Abhinavagupta.

The mention of Nath gurus as siddhas in Buddhist texts found in Tibet and the Himalayan regions led early scholars to propose that Naths may have Buddhist origins, but the Nath doctrines and theology is unlike mainstream Buddhism. In the Tibetan tradition, Matsyendranath of Hinduism is identified with Luipa, one referred to as the first of Buddhist Siddhacharyas. In Nepal, he is a form of Buddhist Avalokiteshvara.

According to Deshpande, the Natha Sampradaya (Devanagari:नाथ संप्रदाय), is a development of the earlier Siddha or Avadhuta Sampradaya, an ancient lineage of spiritual masters. They may be linked to Kapalikas or Kalamukhas given they share their unorthodox lifestyle, though neither the doctrines nor the evidence that links them has been uncovered. The Nath Yogis were admired by Bhakti movement saint Kabir.

Natha Panthis

The Nath Sampradaya is traditionally divided into twelve streams or Panths. According to David Gordon White, these panths were not really a subdivision of a monolithic order, but rather an amalgamation of separate groups descended from either Matsyendranath, Gorakshanath or one of their students. However, there have always been many more Natha sects than will conveniently fit into the twelve formal panths.

In Goa, the town called Madgaon may have been derived from Mathgram, a name it received from being a center of Nath Sampradaya Mathas (monasteries). Nath yogis practiced yoga and pursued their beliefs there, living inside caves. The Divar island and Pilar rock-cut caves were used for meditation by the Nath yogis. In the later half of the 16th century, they were persecuted for their religious beliefs and forced to convert by the Portuguese Christian missionaries. Except for few, the Nath yogi chose to abandon the village.

Contemporary lineages

The Inchegeri Sampradaya, also known as Nimbargi Sampradaya, is a lineage of Hindu Navnath c.q. Lingayat teachers from Maharashtra which was started by Shri Bhausaheb Maharaj. It is inspired by Sant Mat teachers as Namdev, Raidas and Kabir. The Inchegeri Sampraday has become well-known through the popularity of Nisargadatta Maharaj.

Practices

The Nath tradition has two branches, one consisting of sadhus (celibate monks) and other married householder laypeople. The householders are significantly more in number than monks and have the characteristics of an endogamous caste. Both Nath sadhus and householders are found in Nepal and India, but more so in regions such as West Bengal, Nepal, Uttarakhand, Uttar Pradesh, Rajasthan and Karnataka. The ascetics created an oversight organization called the Barah Panthi Yogi Mahasabha in 1906, based in the Hindu sacred town of Haridwar. According to an estimate by Bouillier in 2008, there are about 10,000 ascetics (predominantly males) in the Nath ascetic order, distributed in about 500 monasteries across India but mostly in northern and western regions of India, along with a much larger householder Nath tradition. The oldest known monastery of the Naths that continues to be in use, is near Mangalore, in Karnataka. This monastery (Kadri matha) houses Shaiva iconography from the 10th century.

A notable feature of the monks is that most of them are itinerant, moving from one monastery or location to another, never staying in the same place for long. Many form a floating group of wanderers, where they participate in festivals together, share work and thus form a collective identity. They gather in certain places cyclically, particularly on festivals such as Navratri, Maha Shivaratri and Kumbh Mela. Many walk very long distances over a period of months from one sacred location to another, across India, in their spiritual pursuits.

The Nath monks wear loin cloths and dhotis, little else. Typically they also cover themselves with ashes, tie up their hair in dreadlocks, and when they stop walking, they keep a sacred fire called dhuni. These ritual dressing, covering body with ash, and the body art are, however, uncommon with the householders. Both the Nath monks and householders wear a woolen thread around their necks with a small horn, rudraksha bead and a ring attached to the thread. This is called Singnad Janeu. The small horn is important to their religious practice, is blown during certain festivals, rituals and before they eat. Many Nath monks and a few householders also wear notable earrings.

 Those Nath ascetics who do tantra, include smoking cannabis in flower (marijuana) or resin (charas, hashish) as an offering to Shiva, as part of their practice. The tradition is traditionally known for hatha yoga and tantra, but in contemporary times, the assiduous practice of hatha yoga and tantra is uncommon among the Naths. In some monasteries, the ritual worship is to goddesses and to their gurus such as Adinatha (Shiva), Matsyendranatha and Gorakhshanatha, particularly through bhajan and kirtans. They greet each other with ades (pronounced: "aadees").

Warrior ascetics

The Yogis and Shaiva sampradayas such as Nath metamorphosed into a warrior ascetic group in the late medieval era, with one group calling itself shastra-dharis (keepers of scriptures) and the other astra-dharis (keepers of weapons). The latter group grew and became particularly prominent during the Islamic period in South Asia, from about the 14th to 18th century.

Gurus, siddhas, naths

The Nath tradition revere nine, twelve or more Nath gurus. For example, nine Naths are revered in the Navnath Sampradaya. The most revered teachers across its various subtraditions are:

Matsyendranath

The establishment of the Naths as a distinct historical sect purportedly began around the 8th or 9th century with a simple fisherman, Matsyendranath (sometimes called Minanath, who may be identified with or called the father of Matsyendranath in some sources).

One of earliest known Hatha text Kaula Jnana Nirnaya is attributed to Matsyendra, and dated to the last centuries of the 1st millennium CE. Other texts attributed to him include the Akulavira tantra, Kulananda tantra and Jnana karika.

Gorakshanath

Gorakshanath is considered a Maha-yogi (or great yogi) in the Hindu tradition. Within the Nath tradition, he has been a revered figure, with Nath hagiography describing him as a superhuman who appeared on earth several times. The matha and the city of Gorakhpur in Uttar Pradesh is named after him. The Gurkhas of Nepal and Indian Gorkha take their name after him, as does Gorkha, a historical district of Nepal. The monastery and the temple in Gorakhpur perform various cultural and social activities and serves as the cultural hub of the city, and publishes texts on the philosophy of Gorakhnath. Gorakshanath did not emphasize a specific metaphysical theory or a particular Truth, but emphasized that the search for Truth and spiritual life is valuable and a normal goal of man. Gorakshanath championed Yoga, spiritual discipline and an ethical life of self-determination as a means to reaching siddha state, samadhi and one's own spiritual truths. Gorakshanath, his ideas and yogis have been highly popular in rural India, with monasteries and temples dedicated to him found across the country, particularly in the eponymous city of Gorakhpur, whereas among urban elites, the movement founded by Gorakhnath has been ridiculed.

Aims

According to Muller-Ortega (1989: p. 37), the primary aim of the ancient Nath Siddhas was to achieve liberation or jivan-mukti while alive, and ultimately "paramukti" which it defined as the state of liberation in the current life and into a divine state upon death. 
The Natha Sampradaya is an initiatory Guru-shishya tradition.

According to contemporary Nath Guru, Mahendranath, another aim is to avoid reincarnation. In The Magick Path of Tantra, he wrote about several of the aims of the Naths:

Our aims in life are to enjoy peace, freedom, and happiness in this life, but also to avoid rebirth onto this Earth plane. All this depends not on divine benevolence, but on the way we ourselves think and act.

Hatha yoga

The earliest texts on Hatha yoga of the Naths, such as Vivekamārtaṇḍa and Gorakhshasataka, are from Maharashtra, and these manuscripts are likely from the 13th century. These Nath texts, however, have an overlap with the 13th century Jnanadeva commentary on the Hindu scripture Bhagavada Gita, called the Jnanesvari. This may be because of mutual influence, as both the texts integrate the teachings of Yoga and Vedanta schools of Hinduism in a similar way.

Numerous technical treatises in the Hindu tradition, composed in Sanskrit about Hatha Yoga, are attributed to Gorakshanath.

Influence

The Hatha Yoga ideas that developed in the Nath tradition influenced and were adopted by Advaita Vedanta, though some esoteric practices such as kechari-mudra were omitted. Their yoga ideas were also influential on Vaishnavism traditions such as the Ramanandis, as well as Sufi fakirs in the Indian subcontinent. The Naths recruited devotees into their fold irrespective of their religion or caste, converting Muslim yogins to their fold.

The Nath tradition was influenced by the Bhakti movement saints such as Kabir, Namdev and Jnanadeva.

Notable Naths
 Adityanath – the abbot of the Gorakhnath Math
 Bodhinatha Veylanswami – Sannyasin and Satguru of the Nandinatha Sampradaya
 Satguru Sivaya Subramuniyaswami – a past guru of the Nandinatha Sampradaya
 Shri Madhavnath Maharaj (1857–1936)

See also

References

Bibliography
 
 
 
 
 
 
 
 Davisson, Sven (2003). Shri Kapilnath Interview in Ashé: Journal of Experimental Spirituality, Vol. 2, No. 4, Winter 2003.
 Gold, Daniel and Ann Grodzins Gold (1984). The Fate of the Householder Nath in History of Religions, Vol. 24, No. 2 (Nov., 1984), pp. 113-132.

Further reading

External links

Nath FAQ
Three Lineages. The Navnath Sampradaya and Shree Nisargadatta Maharaj
Gurudev R.D Ranade
International Nath Order

Shaiva sects
Inchegeri Sampradaya
Ascetics
Hindu religious orders